Goran Džokić (born 18 December 1964) is a Serbian handball coach for the Saudi Arabian national team.

References

1964 births
Living people
Serbian handball coaches
Place of birth missing (living people)